José Esteve Juan (also Giuseppe Esteve Stefano) (1550 – 2 November 1603) was a Roman Catholic prelate who served as Bishop of Orihuela (1594–1603) and Bishop of Vieste (1586–1589).

Biography
José Esteve Juan was born in Valencia, Spain in 1550.
On 17 March 1586, he was appointed during the papacy of Pope Sixtus V as Bishop of Vieste. On April 1586, he was consecrated bishop by Giulio Antonio Santorio, Cardinal-Priest of San Bartolomeo all'Isola, with Marco Antonio Marsilio, Archbishop of Salerno, and Scipione de Tolfa, Archbishop of Trani, serving as co-consecrators. In 1589, he resigned as Bishop of Vieste. On 12 January 1594, he was appointed during the papacy of Pope Clement VIII as Bishop of Orihuela. He served as Bishop of Orihuela until his death on 2 November 1603.

Episcopal succession
While bishop, he was the principal co-consecrator of:
Ludovico de Torres, Archbishop of Monreale (1588); and 
Alfonso Laso Sedeño, Bishop of Gaeta (1588).

References

External links and additional sources
 (for Chronology of Bishops) 
 (for Chronology of Bishops)  
 (for Chronology of Bishops)  
 (for Chronology of Bishops)  

16th-century Roman Catholic bishops in Spain
17th-century Roman Catholic bishops in Spain
Bishops appointed by Pope Sixtus V
Bishops appointed by Pope Clement VIII
1550 births
1603 deaths
16th-century Italian Roman Catholic bishops